T. armigera may refer to:
 Tetragnatha armigera, a synonym for Tetragnatha elongata-like, the elongate stilt spider, a spider species found in North and Central America, including Cuba and Jamaica
 Thais armigera, a sea snail species
 Turbinella armigera, a large sea snail species